Haitao "Heather" Zheng is Chinese-American computer scientist and electrical engineer. She is the Neubauer Professor of Computer Science at the University of Chicago. She was elected a Fellow of the Institute of Electrical and Electronics Engineers (IEEE) in 2015 for "contributions to dynamic spectrum access and cognitive radio networks". She was named to the 2022 class of ACM Fellows, "for contributions to wireless networking and mobile computing".

Zheng graduated in 1995 from the Special Class for the Gifted Young of Xi'an Jiaotong University in China, with a B.S. in electrical engineering. In 1999, she earned her Ph.D. in electrical and computer engineering from the University of Maryland, College Park, under the supervision of K. J. Ray Liu. After working at the Bell Labs and Microsoft Research Asia, she joined the faculty of the University of California, Santa Barbara (UCSB) in 2005. In 2017, she was appointed the Neubauer Professor of Computer Science at the University of Chicago. She remains an adjunct professor at UCSB.

References 

Living people
21st-century American engineers
American computer scientists
American electrical engineers
American women engineers
Chinese electrical engineers
Chinese emigrants to the United States
Chinese women computer scientists
Chinese women engineers
Fellow Members of the IEEE
Fellows of the Association for Computing Machinery
Microsoft Research people
Xi'an Jiaotong University alumni
University of California, Santa Barbara faculty
University of Chicago faculty
University of Maryland, College Park alumni
Year of birth missing (living people)
American women academics
21st-century American women